"Darkside" is a song recorded by American rock band Blink-182. The song was released on July 26, 2019 through Columbia Records, as the fourth single from the band's eighth studio album Nine. It was written by bassist Mark Hoppus, drummer Travis Barker, and guitarist Matt Skiba, as well as producer John Feldmann.

Release
"Darkside" was released on July 26, 2019.

Music video
The official music video for "Darkside" premiered on August 28, 2019. In the clip, the trio perform at an elementary school, surrounded by children performing dance moves from the online video game Fortnite. Everybody in the video is shown wearing red collar shirts. The band promoted the video on social media with the tagline "Here's a video for Darkside with a bunch of kids doing dances we don't know."

Despite an intricate video, a large number of fans received this video poorly. Fans questioned the target audience of Blink-182 as a whole, and furthermore felt confused by the music video's direction.

Track listing
 Digital download
 "Darkside" – 3:00

Personnel
Credits adapted from the album's liner notes.

Locations
Recorded at Foxy Studios (Los Angeles, California); Studio 1111 (Beverly Hills, California); Opra Studios (North Hollywood, California)
Engineered at Foxy Studios (Los Angeles, California)
Mixed at Lotus Eater Studio (Santa Monica, California)
Mastered at Chris Athens Masters (Austin, Texas)

Personnel

Blink-182
Matt Skiba – vocals, guitars
Mark Hoppus – vocals, bass guitar
Travis Barker – drums, percussion

Design
Chris Feldmann – art direction, design
Mark Rubbo – CGI and neon design
RISK – title

Production
Chris Athens – mastering
John Feldmann – producer, songwriting
Rich Costey – mixing
Dylan McLean – engineer
Scot Stewart – engineer

Charts

References

2019 singles
2019 songs
Blink-182 songs
Songs written by Mark Hoppus
Songs written by Matt Skiba
Songs written by Travis Barker
Songs written by John Feldmann
Song recordings produced by John Feldmann